Lisnaran Fort is a ringfort (rath) and National Monument located in County Louth, Ireland.

Location
Lisnaran Fort is located outside Annagassan, near the meeting-point of the River Glyde and River Dee.

History

Lisnaran contains the remains of circular and a rectangular structures, and may have featured more extensive defences outside the main enclosure. It was historically associated with the Viking longphort Linn Duachaill, but the combination of a hillfort with round and rectangular structures suggests a Gaelic Irish origin. The only find at Lisnaran was a wooden box in 1928, containing twelve silver pennies, all dating from 1279–1315 and from the reign of Edward I or Edward II as Lord of Ireland.

References

Archaeological sites in County Louth
National Monuments in County Louth